Combustion is the process through which matter burns.

Combustion may also refer to:

The burning of fuel to power a motor..., as with an internal combustion engine or external combustion engine
Spontaneous human combustion
Combustion (album), 2005 album by Decoded Feedback
Combustion (film), 2013 Spanish film
Combustion (software), video compositing application from Autodesk